Pertti Antero Koivulahti (7 June 1951 – 11 March 2019) was a professional ice hockey player who played in the SM-liiga.  Born in Tampere, Finland, he played for Tappara.  He was inducted into the Finnish Hockey Hall of Fame in 1992.

He died in Tampere on 11 March 2019.

References

Finnish Hockey Hall of Fame bio

1951 births
2019 deaths
Ice hockey players at the 1976 Winter Olympics
Olympic ice hockey players of Finland
Ice hockey people from Tampere
Tappara players